Kimani Ffriend (born 29 July 1977) is Jamaican former professional basketball player. He played at the center position.

College career
Ffriend played NCAA college basketball with the Nebraska Cornhuskers from 1999 to 2001. Prior that, Ffriend attended Gulf Coast Community College and DeKalb College.

Professional career
Ffriend started his professional career with the Greenville Groove of the National Basketball Development League (NBDL) in the 2001–02 season.

Jamaica national team
Ffriend won the gold medal at the 2009 FIBA CBC Championship with the Jamaica national team.

Off the court
In the early morning hours of Saturday, 3 November 2012, Kimani Ffriend hit a 29-year-old woman with his car in downtown Belgrade at the intersection of Francuska Street and Cara Dušana Street, killing her instantly. According to the reports, the basketball player was driving under the influence, with 0.98‰ of alcohol in his blood as determined via a breathalyzer test administered by the police. Twenty-nine-year-old victim Nevena Dragutinović was with her twin sister when she was struck by Ffriend with his Škoda Fabia and killed. Her sister was taken to the emergency center in a state of shock. The accident happened around 4:20 a.m. CET. Ffriend told the police that he had tried to avoid a taxi that was in the right lane, that he had therefore swerved into the left lane and hit the victim. Ffriend left the Valjevo-based Metalac basketball club on the same day earlier, as he was supposed to transfer to Spanish CB Valladolid.

On 5 November 2012, an investigative judge from the Higher Court in Belgrade ordered Ffriend detained for 30 days due to a "possibility of the suspect fleeing the country".

On 5 September 2014, the Belgrade Higher Court found Ffriend guilty of committing a "severe act against public traffic safety" and sentenced him to 3 years in prison along with a 2-year ban on operating motorized vehicles.

See also
 List of foreign basketball players in Serbia

References

External links
 Kimani Ffriend at legabasket.it
 Kimani Ffriend at euroleague.net

1977 births
Living people
ABA League players
Apollon Limassol BC players
Baloncesto Fuenlabrada players
BC Dynamo Moscow players
Beijing Ducks players
Beşiktaş men's basketball players
Bornova Belediye players
Brose Bamberg players
Centers (basketball)
Jamaican expatriate basketball people in Serbia
Greenville Groove players
Hapoel Jerusalem B.C. players
Israeli Basketball Premier League players
Jamaican men's basketball players
Jamaican expatriate basketball people in the United States
Junior college men's basketball players in the United States
Jamaican expatriate basketball people in Turkey
KK Dynamic players
KK FMP (1991–2011) players
KK Jagodina players
KK Metalac Valjevo players
OKK Beograd players
Liga ACB players
Mersin Büyükşehir Belediyesi S.K. players
Nebraska Cornhuskers men's basketball players
Pallacanestro Varese players
Panteras de Miranda players
Metropolitans 92 players
Sportspeople from Kingston, Jamaica
Trotamundos B.B.C. players